The title "Gold", in reference to a compilation album, may refer to:

 Gold: Greatest Hits, a 1992 compilation of ABBA
 Gold (ABC album), a 2006 reissue of Look of Love: The Very Best of ABC
 Gold (Ace of Base album), a 2019 compilation
 Gold (Aerosmith album), a 2005 reissue of Young Lust: The Aerosmith Anthology
 Gold (The Allman Brothers Band album), a 2005 compilation
 Gold (Bachman–Turner Overdrive album), a 2005 compilation
 Gold (The Beautiful South album),  a 2006 compilation
 Gold (Bob Marley & The Wailers album), a 2005 compilation
 Gold (Boney M. album), a 2019 compilation
 Gold (Brian McKnight album), a 2007 compilation
 Gold (Cameo album), a 2005 compilation
 Gold: 35th Anniversary Edition, a 2004 compilation of The Carpenters
 Gold (Cat Stevens album), a 2005 compilation
 Gold (Cher album), a 2005 compilation
 Gold (Chris de Burgh album), a 2007 compilation
 Anthology, a Chuck Berry album reissued in 2005 as Gold
 Gold (The Cranberries album), a 2008 compilation
 Gold (Cream album), a 2005 compilation
 Gold (Donna Summer album), a 2005 compilation
 Gold (Ella Fitzgerald album), a 2007 compilation
 Gold (Eric B. & Rakim album), a 2005 compilation
 Gold (Etta James album), a 2007 compilation
 Gold (Jefferson Starship album), a 1979 compilation
 Gold (Joe Cocker album), a 2006 compilation
 Gold (John Cale album), a 2007 reissue of The Island Years
 Gold (Kiss album), a 2005 compilation
 Luv' Gold, a 1993 compilation
 Gold (Lynyrd Skynyrd album), a 2006 reissue of The Essential Lynyrd Skynyrd
 Gold (Michael Jackson album), a 2008 compilation
 Gold (The Moody Blues album), a 2005 compilation
 Gold, a 2007 reissue of The Anthology (1947–1972) by Muddy Waters
 Gold (Olivia Newton-John album), a 2005 compilation
 Gold (Parliament album), a 2005 compilation
 Gold (Pete Townshend album), a 2005 compilation
 Gold (Roger Daltrey album), a 2006 compilation
 Gold (Rush album), a 2006 compilation
 Gold (Scorpions album), a 2005 compilation
 Gold (September album), a 2008 compilation
 Gold (Siouxsie and the Banshees album), a 2007 reissue of The Best of Siouxsie and the Banshees
 Gold (Sonicflood album), a 2004 compilation
 Gold (Steely Dan album), a 1982 compilation
 Gold (The Stranglers album), a 2003 compilation
 Gold (Styx album), a 2006 reissue of Come Sail Away – The Styx Anthology
 Retrospectacle – The Supertramp Anthology, a 2005 compilation released in the US under the title Gold
 Gold (Tesla album), a 2008 compilation
 Gold (Traffic album), a 2005 compilation
 The Best of UFO: Gold Collection, a 1999 compilation
 Gold (The Velvet Underground album), a 2005 compilation
 Gold, a 2008 compilation of Aaron Neville
 Gold, a 2005 compilation of Asia
 Gold, a 2008 compilation of Astrud Gilberto
 Gold, a 2008 compilation of Barry White
 Gold, a 2008 compilation of Bo Diddley
 Gold, a 2006 compilation of Cinderella
 Gold, a 2007 compilation of The Crusaders
 Gold, a 2000 reissue of Anthology by Don Williams
 Gold, a 2008 compilation of Dusty Springfield
 Gold, a 2005 compilation of Engelbert Humperdinck
 Gold, a 2008 compilation of François Feldman
 Gold, a 2006 compilation of The Gap Band
 Gold, a 2006 compilation of Georges Moustaki
 Gold, a 2006 compilation of Gladys Knight & the Pips
 Hank Williams Gold, a 2005 reissue of The Ultimate Collection by Hank Williams
 Gold, a 2005 reissue of The Sound of the Jam by The Jam
 Gold, a 1974 compilation of John Lee Hooker
 Gold, a 2007 compilation of John Lee Hooker
 Gold, a 2005 compilation of Kool & the Gang
 Gold, a 2006 compilation of Lionel Richie
 Gold, a 2006 compilation of Loretta Lynn
 Gold: Martha Reeves & the Vandellas, a 2006 compilation of Martha and the Vandellas
 Marvin Gaye: Gold, a 2005 compilation of Marvin Gaye
 Gold, a 2006 compilation of The Mavericks
 Nana Mouskouri (Gold), a 2006 compilation of Nana Mouskouri
 Gold, a 2005 compilation of Neil Diamond
 Gold, a 2005 compilation of The Neville Brothers
 Gold, a 2005 compilation of New Edition
 Gold, a 2007 compilation of The Oak Ridge Boys
 Gold, a 2008 compilation of Ohio Players
 Gold, a 2005 compilation of Patti LaBelle
 Gold, a 2005 compilation of Peter Frampton
 Gold, a 2006 compilation of Poco
 Gold, a 2005 compilation of Rick James
 Gold, a 2005 compilation of Rod Stewart
 Gold, a 2006 compilation of Soraya
 Gold, a 2005 compilation of Squeeze
 Gold, a 2006 compilation of The Statler Brothers
 Gold, a 2006 compilation of Stephanie Mills
 Gold, a 2006 compilation of The Style Council
 Gold, a 2005 compilation of Sublime
 The Supremes: Gold, a 2005 compilation of The Supremes
 Gold, a 2006 compilation of Tears for Fears
 The Temptations: Gold, a 2005 compilation of The Temptations
 Gold, a 2005 compilation of Them
 Gold, a 2005 compilation of Tom Jones
 Gold, a 2006 compilation of Tri Yann
 Gold, a 2006 compilation of Whitesnake

Lists of compilation albums